The original version of I Can See Your Voice (abbreviated ICSYV and also stylized as I Can See Your Voice — Mystery music game show) is a South Korean television mystery music game show that broadcasts originally on Mnet and is simulcasted on tvN. The program's producer Lee Seon-young said she originally envisioned a program that will allow anyone to be the main character regardless of their appearances, and was inspired by Kim Bum-soo who struggled to gain recognition because of his look.

On December 20, 2021 announced its return with season 9 and it premiered on January 29, 2022 at 22.40 KST

Gameplay

Format
Presented with a group of six "mystery singers" identified only by their occupation, a guest artist must attempt to eliminate bad singers from the group without ever hearing them sing, assisted by clues and a celebrity panel over the course of three rounds. At the end of the game, the last remaining mystery singer is revealed as either good or bad by means of a duet between them and one of the guest artists.

The original version has two different formats:

Original format
Under the original format, the guest artists) can eliminate one or two mystery singers in each round, and the last mystery singer standing will perform a duet.

Star Wars format (season 1, final episode only)
Under the "Star Wars" format, ten former mystery singers were separated into two teams. For each round, a mystery singer is chosen for a "showdown". Afterward, voting is done through audience majority, and the votes are accumulated for the winning team.

Rewards
The winning mystery singer is awarded on the following conditions:
If the singer is good, he/she will have release a digital single. In the fifth-season premiere, the winning singer, regardless of being good or bad, receives a microphone trophy.
If the singer is bad, he/she wins .

Rounds
Each episode presents the guest artist with six people whose identities and singing voices are kept concealed until they are eliminated to perform on the "stage of truth" or remain in the end to perform the final duet.

Inside an enclosed podium, the identity and appearance of sixth participant (as "surprise" mystery singer) remains concealed until its revelation at the ending phase of a game.

Notes:

Series overview

Episodes
 – Skilled Vocalist 
 – Tone-deaf 
In the tone-deaf group of two or more participants including at least one skilled vocalist, the participant having an italicized name is really a tone-deaf, the other is a skilled vocalist. No italicization for other case.

Season 1

Season 2

Season 3

Season 4

Season 5

Season 6

Season 7

Season 8

Season 9

Ratings
In the table below,  represent the lowest ratings and  represent the highest ratings.

Season 1

Season 2

Season 3

Season 4

Season 5

Season 6

Season 7

Season 8

Season 9

Awards and nominations

Footnotes

References

External links
  (season 9) 
 I Can See Your Voice season 1 
 I Can See Your Voice season 2  
 I Can See Your Voice season 3  
 I Can See Your Voice seasons 4–6 

I Can See Your Voice (South Korean game show)
South Korean variety television shows
Mnet (TV channel) original programming
Television series by Signal Entertainment Group
2010s South Korean television series
2020s South Korean television series
2015 South Korean television series debuts
2022 South Korean television series endings
Television game shows with incorrect disambiguation